South Salt Lake City  is a streetcar stop in South Salt Lake, Utah, in the United States, served by Utah Transit Authority's (UTA) S Line (previously known as the Sugar House Streetcar). The S Line provides service from the Sugar House neighborhood of Salt Lake City to the city of South Salt Lake (where it connects with UTA's TRAX light rail system).

Description
The South Salt Lake City stop is located at about 30 East in the median of a newly created street called Central Pointe Place, which runs east-west at about 2200 South; however the official address of the stop is 2240 South Main Street. (Although this stop is located it the median of Central Pointe Place, it should not be confused with the Central Pointe station.) The island platform is located on the north side of the existing single set of tracks. The stop is easily accessible from both Main Street and State Street (US-89). There is limited angle parking available along a portion of both sides of Central Pointe Place. (As of early February 2014, the Central Pointe Place street was still not open to vehicular traffic.) The passenger platform includes a memorial to the history of the area. The stop began service on December 8, 2013, and is operated by Utah Transit Authority.

Notes

References

UTA streetcar stops
Railway stations in the United States opened in 2013
Railway stations in Salt Lake County, Utah
2013 establishments in Utah